A bungkaka, also known as the bamboo buzzer is a percussion instrument (idiophone) made out of bamboo common in numerous indigenous tribes around the Philippines such as the Ifugao, Kalinga, and Ibaloi.

Construction
The instrument is constructed from a length of buho (bamboo) with a node at the bottom end. The upper half is shaped such that there are two tongues facing each other, while the bottom end acts as a resonator chamber.

Playing
The instrument generates a buzzing sound from the slit between the two tongues when the instrument is struck against the lower palm of the hand of the player. Furthermore, the sound can be altered by covering and uncovering a hole found on the bottom half of the instrument with the thumb of the hand which grasps the instrument.

References

Idiophones
Culture of Ifugao
Culture of Kalinga (province)
Culture of Benguet
Philippine musical instruments
Bamboo musical instruments